Major-General Harry Willans  (1892 – 5 February 1943) was a British Army officer.

Military career
Born the son of James and Henrietta Willans and educated at Aldenham School, Willans was commissioned into the Bedfordshire Regiment on 23 May 1916. He became commanding officer of the Artists Rifles in 1933, commander of the 168th (2nd London) Infantry Brigade in May 1938 and General Officer Commanding 47th (London) Infantry Division in August 1939. He went on to be Director-General of Welfare and Education at the War Office in December 1940. He was killed in a flying accident at El Adem Airfield near Tobruk in February 1943.

He was appointed a Companion of the Order of the Bath in the 1943 New Year Honours.

References

Bibliography

External links
Generals of World War II

1892 births
1943 deaths
People from Bedford
Burials in Libya
Military personnel from Bedford
British Army major generals
Bedfordshire and Hertfordshire Regiment officers
Companions of the Order of the Bath
Commanders of the Order of the British Empire
Companions of the Distinguished Service Order
Recipients of the Military Cross
British Army generals of World War II
People educated at Aldenham School
British Army personnel killed in World War II
British Army personnel of World War I
Artists' Rifles officers
War Office personnel in World War II
Victims of aviation accidents or incidents in 1943
Victims of aviation accidents or incidents in Libya